Jan Duiker (also Johannes Duiker) (The Hague, 1 March 1890 – Amsterdam, 23 February 1935) was a Dutch architect. Partnership with Bernard Bijvoet from 1919 until 1925. For the commission of the Zonnestraal project the architects were recommended by Hendrik Berlage. Bijvoet left the Netherlands in 1925 to work in Paris with Pierre Chareau for projects such as Maison de Verre et al. Jan Duiker is one of the most important representatives of the Constructivist movement. He is buried at Zorgvlied cemetery.

Notable work 
Town houses in The Hague (1919-1922): J.v.Oldenbarneveldtlaan, Imhoffplein, Jacob Catslaan, Eikstraat, Ieplaan, Thomsonlaan, Thomsonplein etc.
"Meer en Bosch", residential area with villas in The Hague-Kijkduin (1921-1923).
Single-family house in Aalsmeer (1924-1925).
"Zonnestraal", sanatorium in Hilversum (project studies since 1919, construction 1926-1928). Nomination for UNESCO World Heritage.
"Nirwana", residential building in The Hague (1928-1930).
"Openluchtschool", open air school in Amsterdam-South (1929-1930).
"Derde Ambachtschool", third technical school in The Hague-Scheveningen (1930-1931).
"Cineac", cinema in Amsterdam (1934).
"Winter", department store in Amsterdam (1934-1935), demolished.
"Gooiland", hotel and theatre in Hilversum (1934-1936), finished by Bernard Bijvoet in 1936.

Literature 
Jan Molema, "Jan Duiker", works and projects, preface by Kenneth Frampton, Barcelona 1991. (English/Spanish)
Paul Meurs and Marie-Therese van Thoor (eds.), "Zonnestraal Sanatorium - The History and Restoration of a Modern Monument", 18 articles by Hubert-Jan Henket, Ton Idsinga, Wessel de Jonge, Jan Molema, Bruno Reichlin et al., Rotterdam 2010. (English Edition)

1890 births
1935 deaths
Architects from The Hague